Tahera Shireen Rahman is a newscaster who is known for becoming the first full-time hijabi Muslim broadcast newscaster in the United States, on February 8, 2018, for WHBF-TV after previously working for the station as a producer.

Early life and education 
Rahman was born to Pakistani and Indian immigrants outside of Chicago. She attended Loyola University Chicago earning a Bachelor of Arts in journalism and international studies. Rahman was also the first Muslim to hold the position of Editor in Chief of Loyola's weekly student paper, the Loyola Phoenix.

Career 
Tahera Rahman's first job where she was trained as producer and a host was at the daily Radio Islam show at WCEV 1450 AM in Chicago which was produced by Sound Vision Foundation from 1999 to 2019. She worked for WHBF-TV and KLJB until September 27, 2019, and currently works for KXAN-TV in Austin, Texas.

References

External links 
 
 Breaking Barriers without Breaking Principles - Tahera Rahman | Confident Muslim

21st-century American women
American Muslims
CBS News people
Fox News people
1991 births
Living people